Ulrike Trebesius (born 17 April 1970) is a German politician. From 2014 until 2019, she served as Member of the European Parliament (MEP) representing Germany.

References

External links 
 

1970 births
Living people
Alternative for Germany MEPs
MEPs for Germany 2014–2019
21st-century women MEPs for Germany
People from Halle (Saale)
German civil engineers